Dianne Barr (born 13 September 1972) is a Northern Irish Paralympic swimmer from Larne.  Barr started swimming at the age of four, and has a congenital abnormality of the lower leg.  At the age of eleven, her lower leg was amputated and replaced with a prosthetic limb.

Barr represented Team GB & NI at the 1988 Summer Paralympic Games in Seoul, at the age of 16, winning gold in the 100m backstroke A4, the 4 × 100m medley relay and the 4 × 100m freestyle relay  with her teammates Joanne Rout, Thelma Young and Linda Walters.  She also won bronze in the 100m freestyle A4 and the 400m freestyle A4.  At the 1992 Summer Paralympic Games, Barr won bronze in the 100m backstroke S10.

In 2012, Trevor Ringland, who like Barr attended Larne Grammar School, called for more recognition for Barr's impressive achievements.

References 

1972 births
Living people
Sportspeople from County Antrim
People from Larne
Paralympic swimmers of Great Britain
Paralympic gold medalists for Great Britain
Paralympic bronze medalists for Great Britain
People educated at Larne Grammar School
Medalists at the 1988 Summer Paralympics
Medalists at the 1992 Summer Paralympics
Swimmers at the 1988 Summer Paralympics
Swimmers at the 1992 Summer Paralympics
Paralympic medalists in swimming
British female freestyle swimmers
British female backstroke swimmers
S10-classified Paralympic swimmers